Kesari may refer to:

Kesari (2019 film), an Indian Hindi-language film
Kesari (2020 film), an Indian Marathi-language film
Kesari (Malayalam newspaper), a defunct Indian Malayalam-language newspaper
Kesari (newspaper), an Indian Marathi-language newspaper
INS Kesari, ships of the Indian Navy
Kesari dynasty
Kesari (Ramayana), father of Hanuman (a hero of Ramayana)

People
Kesari Balakrishna Pillai (1889–1960), Indian writer, critic in Malayalam who wrote under the pseudonym Kesari, and the name of a Malayalam-language newspaper he started
Kesari Singh Barahath (1872–1941), Indian poet and freedom fighter
K. N. Kesari (1875–1953), Indian physician, social reformer, philanthropist, author, magazine editor and music patron
Kamraj Kesari (1922–1985), cricketer
Narayan Singh Kesari (born 1936), Indian politician of the Bharatiya Janata Party
Vengayil Kunhiraman Nayanar (1861–1914), Indian writer who also used Kesari as a pseudonym

See also
Kesari bhath, an Indian dessert made of semolina, sugar, and ghee
 Khesari, a type of grass pea
Keshar (disambiguation)
Lathyrus sativus